Fort Sherman is a former United States Army base in Panama, located on Toro Point at the Caribbean (northern) end of the Panama Canal, on the western bank of the Canal directly opposite Colón (which is on the eastern bank). It was the primary defensive base for the Caribbean sector of the Canal, and was also the center for US jungle warfare training for some time. Its Pacific-side partner was Fort Amador. Both bases were turned over to Panama in 1999.

History

Concurrent with the Canal construction a number of defensive locations were developed to protect it, both with coastal defense guns, as well as military bases to defend against a direct infantry assault. Fort Sherman was the primary Caribbean-side infantry base, while Fort Amador protected the Pacific side. Construction of Fort Sherman began in January 1912 as a phase of the original 1910 defensive plans. Fort Sherman was named by War Department General Order No. 153 dated November 24, 1911, in honor of General William Tecumseh Sherman.

The Fort included  of land, about half of which was covered by jungle. The developed areas included housing, barracks for 300, a small airstrip and various recreational areas.  Sherman was the site of the US's first operationally deployed early warning radar when an SCR-270 was installed there in 1941.

Batteries
The fort contained the following batteries
 Battery Baird  4 12-inch mortars
 Battery Howard 4 12-inch mortars
 Battery Stanley 1 14-inch disappearing gun
 Battery Mower 1 14-inch disappearing gun
 Battery Kilpatrick 2 6-inch disappearing guns
 Battery Sedgwick Pratt 2 12-inch M1895 barbettes
 Battery Alexander Mackenzie 2 12-inch barbettes

During WW1 supplemental shore batteries were added on or near Fort Sherman using field pieces.
 4 155-mm guns
 4 75-mm guns

Modern use
After the decommissioning of the U.S. Army Coast Artillery Corps, the forested area was used by the United States Army South (USARSO) Jungle Operations Training Center (JOTC). JOTC was founded in 1951 to train both US and allied Central American forces in jungle warfare, with an enrollment of about 9,000 a year. The JOTC also taught a ten-day Air Crew Survival Course open to all branches of service and a four-week Engineer Jungle Warfare Course. Upon completion of the course the Jungle Expert Patch was awarded.

Between 1966 and 1979, 1,160 sounding rockets with maximum flight altitudes of 99 kilometres were launched from Fort Sherman.
Fort Sherman was used in the filming of the 2008 James Bond film Quantum of Solace.

See also
 List of former United States military installations in Panama

Notes

References
 Military Railroads on the Panama Canal Zone by Charles S. Small, Railroad monographs 1982

External links
 Wikimapia: Map of Fort Sherman

Closed installations of the United States Army
Historic American Buildings Survey in the former Panama Canal Zone
Military installations of the United States in Panama
Panama Canal